The following is a list of characters from the Dark Shadows franchise. The list distinguishes characters from the original ABC daytime soap opera series, the 1970s films, the 1991 NBC remake series, the 2004 WB pilot, and the 2012 film.

1966–1971: Dark Shadows

1970: House of Dark Shadows

1971: Night of Dark Shadows

1991: Dark Shadows

2004: Dark Shadows

2012: Dark Shadows

Notes
  Don Briscoe would portray Chris Jennings and Alex Stevens would portray the werewolf. Stevens was also the stunt coordinator.

References

External links
 
 
 
 
 
 

 
Dark Shadows
Dark Shadows
Dark Shadows